Manganosite is a rare mineral composed of manganese(II) oxide MnO. It was first described in 1817 for an occurrence in the Harz Mountains, Saxony-Anhalt, Germany. It has also been reported from Langban and Nordmark, Sweden and at Franklin Furnace, New Jersey. It also occurs in Japan, Kyrgyzstan and Burkina Faso.

It occurs in manganese nodules. It also occurs as alteration of manganese minerals such as rhodocrosite during low oxygen metamorphism and metasomatism.

References

Oxide minerals
Manganese(II) minerals
Cubic minerals
Minerals in space group 225
Rocksalt group